Nothing but Love is a 1998 album by The Wilkinsons. It may also refer to:

Music
 Nothing but Love World Tour, a 2009–2010 concert tour by Whitney Houston

Albums
 Nothing but Love, a 2012 album by Brian Free and Assurance
 Nuttin' but Love, a 1994 album by Heavy D & the Boyz
 Nothing but Love, album by Indonesian singer Whizzkid, AMI Awards 2011#Winner and nominees

Songs
 "Nothing but Love", a song from the 1930 American film, Half Shot at Sunrise
 "Nothing but Love", song by Bobo Jenkins	1955
 "Nothing but Love", song by The Tartans and The Kaddo Strings 1966
 "Nothing but Love", song by John Wesley Ryles	1979
 "Nothing but Love", song by Peter Tosh with Gwen Guthrie	1981
 "Nothing but Love", a 1991 single by American Christian singer, Twila Paris
 "Nothing but Love", a song by The Dells with Billy Valentine, heard in the 1991 film, The Five Heartbeats
 "Nothing but Love", a song from Bump Ahead, a 1993 album by Mr. Big
 "Nothing but Love", a song released with the 1993 single by Tupac Shakur "I Get Around (Tupac Shakur song)"
 "Nuttin' but Love (Heavy D & the Boyz song)", a 1994 song by Heavy D & the Boyz from their album of the same name
 "Nothing but Love (Standing in the Way)", a 1998 song by The Wilkinsons
 "Nothing but Love", a 2010 single by Axwell
 "Nothing but Love", a song from the rock band The Gracious Few's 2010 self-titled debut album
 "Nothing but Love", a song from All for You (Titanium album), 2012
 "Nothing but Love", a song from 3 Pears, a 2012 album by Dwight Yoakam
 "Nothing but Love", a song by English rock band James from their 2016 album, "Girl at the End of the World"